Yahmureh-ye Seh (also Romanized as Yaḩmūreh-ye Seh) is a village in Shoaybiyeh-ye Gharbi Rural District, Shadravan District, Shushtar County, Khuzestan Province, Iran. At the 2006 census, its population was 111, in 21 families.

References 

Populated places in Shushtar County